Jai Singh I (15 July 1611 – 28 August 1667) was a senior general ("Mirza Raja") of the Mughal Empire and the Raja of the Kingdom of Amber (later called Jaipur). His predecessor was his grand uncle, Raja Bhau Singh.

Accession and early career 

At the age of 10, Jai Singh I became the Raja of Amber and the head of the Kachwaha Rajputs. His military career spans the full reign of Shah Jahan and the first decade of Aurangzeb's reign. Jai Singh's first step in his rise to greatness took place on the accession of Shah Jahan (1627). Taking advantage of this change of sovereigns, Jai Singh's commander in the Deccan, Khan Jahan Lodi rebelled along with his Afghan followers. But the Rajput prince brought away his own army to the north and then joined in the campaign that finally defeated the rebels.

For these valuable services Jai Singh was made a commander of 4000. In 1636 Shah Jahan organized a grand campaign against the southern sultanates in which Jai Singh played a leading part—later this same army was sent to campaign against the Gond kingdoms. For his part in these successful ventures Jai Singh was promoted to the rank of commander of 5000 and the district of Chatsu (in Ajmer) was added to his kingdom. By defeating the Meo robber tribes in the north of Amber, Jai Singh further increased the size of his ancestral kingdom. in 1641 he subdued the rebellion of Raja Jagat Singh Pathania of the hill-state of Mau-Paithan (Himachal Pradesh).

Central Asian campaigns 
In 1638 the fort of Kandahar was surrendered by its Safavid Persian commander, Ali Mardan Khan, to Shah Jahan. The emperor's son Shuja, accompanied by Jai Singh, was sent to take delivery of this important fort. To overawe the Persian Shah from interfering in this task, Shah Jahan assembled a 50,000 strong army in Kabul. On this occasion Jai Singh received the unique title of Mirza Raja from Shah Jahan, which had earlier been given to his grandfather Raja Man Singh I of Amber by Emperor Akbar.

In 1647 Jai Singh joined in Shah Jahan's invasion of Balkh and Badakhshan in Central Asia.

In 1649 another blow knocked down Mughal prestige—Kandahar was recovered by Shah Abbas II. In the ensuing Mughal-Safavid War the Mughals twice attempted to eject the Persians from Kandahar under the command of Prince Aurangzeb (in 1649 and 1652) —on both occasions Jai Singh was present as an army commander, but the attempts failed due to the lack of adequate artillery and poor marksmanship of the Mughal gunners.

A third grand attempt was made in 1653 under the command of Shah Jahan's oldest and favorite son Dara Shikoh, a deadly rival of Aurangzeb, and again Jai Singh was sent with this army. Prince Dara was knowledgeable in spiritual matters and was refreshingly secular in his outlook, but these noble qualities were marred by his military incompetence and his flattering and foolish advisers. Dara was particularly harsh on officers that had taken part in the earlier campaigns under Aurangzeb and repeatedly taunted Jai Singh for those failures. But when his own campaign ended with the same result, the Mughals finally gave up all attempts to recover Kandahar.

Dara continued his hostility towards Jai Singh on return to Agra. No promotions or awards were given to the veteran general for skillfully covering the army's retreat. Instead Jaswant Singh of the rival Rathor clan was made commander of 6000 and received the superlative title of Maharaja.

Mughal succession war 
In 1657 Shah Jahan fell seriously ill, to the extent that he was incapacitated. Dara's three younger brothers made preparations to seize the throne. Shah Shuja in Bengal and Murad in Gujarat crowned themselves emperors, but the clever Aurangzeb merely declared his intention of rescuing his father for the sake of Islam. In the face of these triple dangers, Dara Shikoh now remembered Jai Singh—the Rajput chief was made commander of 6000 and sent east along with Dara's son Sulaiman and the Afghan general Diler Khan.

They triumphed over Shuja at the Battle of Bahadurpur (14 February) and chased him back to Bengal (May). By that time Aurangzeb had won the Battle of Dharmat and the Battle of Samugarh and had captured Agra (8 June). Jai Singh and his men were stuck far in the east while their homes and families in the west were at the mercy of Aurangzeb's troops—so he and Diler Khan advised Sulaiman to flee while they submitted to the new emperor. Then he so sided with Aurangzeb that Jai Singh advised Raja Jaswant Singh who was about to help Dara against it.

Despite his victories Aurangzeb did not have a secure footing on the Mughal throne, and though bigoted, he needed the support of the leading Muslim and Rajput generals. So he pardoned Maharaja Jaswant Singh who had fought him at Dharmat and promoted Jai Singh as a commander of 7000, the highest possible rank for any general. Dara was treacherously captured by a Pashtun chief in Baluchistan and was executed by Aurangzeb in 1659.

Campaign against Marathas

The Deccan Wars between the Mughal Empire and the southern sultanates had been complicated by the rise of the Maratha king Shivaji . In 1659, Shivaji killed Afzal Khan, a notable general of Bijapur. In 1664, he sacked the rich port city of Surat in Gujarat. Raja Jai Singh, who had begun his own military career in the Deccan, was appointed to lead a 14,000 strong army against Deccan Sultanates as well as rising Marathas.
After winning several forts in Maharashtra from the Maratha king and besieging the fort of Purandar, he managed to force Shivaji  to sign the Treaty of Purandar. Mirza Raje Jai Singh convinced Shivaji to come to terms and join him in an invasion of Bijapur which would be beneficial for both sides. According to Jadunath Sarkar, Jai Singh not only spared the prisoners of war but also gave rewards to those who fought bravely. For this triumph Jai Singh, already the highest ranking general, received rich gifts in gold and silver — both his sons, Ram Singh and Kirat Singh, were raised in rank. The latter was serving under his father, while the former was acting as his agent at the Mughal court.

The invasion of Bijapur commenced in December 1665. Jai Singh now had an army of 40,000 to which Shivaji added 2,000 cavalry and 7,000 infantry. The Bijapuris melted away before this array and Jai Singh reached within 12 miles of Bijapur city. However, the scorched earth tactics of the Deccanis succeeded, Jai Singh's food supply ran out and he was forced to begin his retreat in January 1666.

At this point, Jai Singh sent Shivaji to the Mughal court to meet Emperor Aurangzeb while he conducted his army to safety. At Agra Shivaji Maharaj was arrested but managed to escape (August 1666). Emperor Aurangzeb held Jai Singh's son, Ram Singh, responsible for Shivaji's escape, took away Ram Singh's estates, banished him from the court. Later he pardoned Ram Singh and sent him away to fight the battle of Saraighat in faraway Assam.

Jai Singh was also suspected by Aurangzeb that he helped Shivaji’s escape from Agra, Jai Singh close associate was given money to poison Jai Singh in his food.

Jai Singh died in Burhanpur on 28 August 1667. The fortunes of his family sank low in the next two generations, but were revived later by Jai Singh II.

Aurangzeb erected the Cenetop (Chhatri) at the bank of Tapti River in Burhanpur in honour of Jai Singh I, now called "Raja Ki Chhatri".

Personal life
Jai Singh had two chief queens, Rani Sukmati and Rajiba Bai and 7 children; 5 daughters and 2 sons, including his successor Ram Singh I.

Ancestry

See also 
List of Rajputs

References 

 
 

Haft Anjuman, correspondence of Mirza Raja Jai Singh compiled by his secretary Ugrasen.
 
 
 “A Mughal Icon Reconsidered,” Catherine Glynn and Ellen Smart.  Artibus Asiae , Vol. LVII, 1/2, p. 5.     

Hindu monarchs
Jai 1
1611 births
1667 deaths